Captain Maurice Lea Cooper  (18 December 1898 – 2 October 1918) was an Irish World War I flying ace credited with six aerial victories.

Early life and background
Cooper was born in Dublin, Ireland, the only son of John Hall Cooper, an Irish Presbyterian, and Gertrude Lea Cooper, an English Quaker. He had two sisters; Norah Lea and Joyce. He was educated in Dublin, and later at Bootham School, York, England.

World War I
Cooper joined the Royal Naval Air Service on 29 April 1917, received Royal Aero Club Aviator's Certificate No. 5024 on 16 July, and was commissioned as a flight sub-lieutenant on 29 July.

He was posted to No. 13 (Naval) Squadron to fly the Sopwith Camel single seat fighter. He destroyed an enemy two-seater on 5 December 1917, aided by fellow aces John Pinder, George Chisholm MacKay, and John Paynter. On 29 January 1918, aided by MacKay, Paynter, John Edmund Greene, and Leonard Slatter, he destroyed a seaplane. On 12 March 1918, Cooper shared another victory with Greene, MacKay, and another pilot. On 1 April, Cooper flamed a German two-seater seaplane at Zeebrugge, killing M. R. Behrendt and D. R. Hauptvogel. On 3 June, in the King's Birthday Honours he was awarded the Distinguished Flying Cross, and on 3 July he was appointed a flight commander with the temporary rank of captain. On 7 July, he, Charles Sims, and four other pilots drove down an Albatros D.V. On 30 July 1918, he drove down another D.V at Bruges. That made his tally four enemy aircraft destroyed, three of which were shared wins, and two driven down out of control, one of which was shared.

On 2 October 1918, while bombing an enemy troop train, his aircraft was hit by ground fire and he died in the crash near Gitsberg, Belgium. He is buried in Dadizeele New British Cemetery, Moorslede, West Flanders.

List of aerial victories

References
Notes

Bibliography
 

1898 births
1918 deaths
Military personnel from Dublin (city)
People educated at Bootham School
Royal Naval Air Service personnel of World War I
Royal Air Force personnel of World War I
British military personnel killed in World War I
Irish World War I flying aces
Recipients of the Distinguished Flying Cross (United Kingdom)